Wu Cheng-wen (born 19 June 1938) is a Taiwanese biochemist. He is the former founding president of National Health Research Institutes in 1996–2005.

Wu Was elected as an academician of Taiwan Academia Sinica in 1984. Currently he works as a special lecturer at National Yang-Ming University.

References

1938 births
Affiliated Senior High School of National Taiwan Normal University alumni
Living people
Taiwanese biologists
Members of Academia Sinica
Scientists from Taipei